Rijpwetering is a village in the Dutch province of South Holland.

History 
The village was first mentioned in 1615 as "Rijp weteryng", and means "bank of a waterway". Rijpwetering developed in the Middle Ages as a peat excavation settlement.

The Catholic O.L. Vrouwe Geboorte Church is a three aisled basilica-like church with built-in tower which was constructed between 1858 and 1860 in Gothic Revival style. It was restored between 1997 and 2000. The inn De Vergulden Vos dates from 1618 and has served as inn, weigh house and court house. The polder mills Lijkermolen No.1 and No.2 were built in 1780 are the only twelve sided windmills of the Netherlands. Both wind mills are frequently in service.

Rijpwetering was home to 742 people in 1840.

Notable people
Joop Zoetemelk, Dutch cyclist and winner of the Tour de France 1980, was born in The Hague but grew up in Rijpwetering.

Gallery

References

Populated places in South Holland
Kaag en Braassem